The National Electricity Market Management Company Limited (NEMMCO) was established in 1996 to administer and manage the Australian National Electricity Market (NEM). It was the market operator for the NEM. The governments of Queensland, New South Wales, the Australian Capital Territory, Victoria, South Australia and Tasmania were members of NEMMCO; and each nominated a director to the NEMMCO board.

NEMMCO was a company under Corporations law. It operated on a break-even basis by recovering the costs of operating the NEM and running the organisation by levying fees against market participants. The fees were complex, and comprised both fixed and variable components that took into account the type of participant and their share of trade in the market. The structure of fees payable to NEMMCO was determined periodically, while the actual fee levels were set annually.

NEMMCO managed the market and power system from two control centres in different states. Both centres operated around the clock, and were equipped with identical communication and information technology systems. The entire NEM, or individual regions within it, could be operated from either or both centres. This arrangement was a means of ensuring continuous supply despite the risks that natural disasters or other events presented, and provided NEMMCO with the flexibility to respond quickly to dramatic changes in the market or the power system.

On 1 July 2009, NEMMCO was succeeded by the Australian Energy Market Operator.

See also

 Australian Energy Market Commission
 Australian Energy Regulator
 Energy policy of Australia
 National Electricity Market

References

External links
 NEMMCO (obsolete)

Electricity markets
Electric power companies of Australia
Electric power in Australia   
Energy companies established in 1996
Energy companies disestablished in 2009
Australian companies established in 1996
Australian companies disestablished in 2009